The 2004 Sandwell Metropolitan Borough Council election took place on 10 June 2004 to elect members of Sandwell Metropolitan Borough Council in the West Midlands, England. The whole council was up for election with boundary changes since the last election in 2003. The Labour Party stayed in overall control of the council.

Campaign
Before the election the council was controlled by Labour with 55 seats, compared to 9 for the Conservatives, 6 Liberal Democrats and 2 British National Party.

During the campaign the Chancellor of the Exchequer Gordon Brown visited Sandwell and called on voters to reject the British National Party.

Election result
The results saw Labour easily hold on to control of the council after dropping just 3 seats. The leader of the council, Bill Thomas, described the results as "remarkable" considering it was a mid term election and called it a "vote of confidence". However Labour did lose seats to the Conservatives, including 2 in St Paul's ward, meaning that the Conservatives made a gain of 4 seats. The Liberal Democrats stayed on 6 seats, while the British National Party dropped to just 1 seat. The only successful BNP candidate was in Princes End ward, where James Lloyd was elected, while in the same ward his party colleague John Salvage lost his seat on the council.

Ward results

References

2004 English local elections
2004
2000s in the West Midlands (county)